Krunal Himanshu Pandya (born 24 March 1991) is an Indian international cricketer who has played for Indian cricket team but currently plays for Baroda in domestic cricket and Lucknow Super Giants in the IPL. He is an all-rounder who bats left-handed and bowls slow left-arm orthodox. He made his international debut for the Indian cricket team in November 2018. In 2021, he scored the fastest half-century by a cricketer on ODI debut.

Domestic career
Pandya made his first-class debut on 6 October 2016, playing for Baroda during the 2016–17 Ranji Trophy tournament. Within the next few months, he became the leading run scorer and leading wicket taker for Baroda in 2016-17 Vijay Hazare Trophy. He scored 366 runs in 8 matches, making for an average of 45.75 and strike rate of 81.33. This included three half centuries, with a high score of 78. In bowling, he took 11 wickets in 8 matches with economy rate of 4.82, an average of 25.09 and strike rate of 31.10. His best bowling score during the eight matches was 4/20.  In 2017 he featured in an India A tri-series victory over South Africa A and Afghanistan A.

He was the leading run-scorer for Baroda in the 2018–19 Vijay Hazare Trophy, with 366 runs in eight matches. In October 2018, he was named in India A's squad for the 2018–19 Deodhar Trophy. Pandya was named as the captain of Baroda for the Vijay Hazare Trophy 2019–2020.

He was selected to play for the Warwickshire County Cricket Club in the 2022 Royal London One-Day Cup.

Indian Premier League
At the 2016 IPL auction, Mumbai Indians purchased Pandya for 2 crore. He made his IPL debut in April 2016, playing against Gujarat Lions at Wankhede Stadium, Mumbai.  For his performances in the 2016 IPL season, he was named in the Cricinfo and Cricbuzz IPL XI.

In 2016, he scored 86 from 37 balls and took the wickets of Quinton De Kock and Zaheer Khan and was adjudged to be the Player of the Match against Delhi Daredevils at  ACA-VDCA Stadium, Visakhapatnam. He continued to produce consistent performances with the bat and ball throughout the tournament. He was declared as the Player of the Match for his performance of 47 in a final victory against Rising Pune Supergiant. For his performances in the 2017 IPL season, he was named in the Cricinfo and Cricbuzz IPL XI.

In January 2018, Pandya was signed up by the Mumbai Indians in the 2018 IPL auction. He had scored 160 against Railways in Ranji trophy with 21 boundaries and he was the highest run scorer in the first innings for Baroda with a strike rate of 73.06 in his second first class game.

In IPL 2021, Pandya's over-aggressive reactions over the field took center stage. A lot of times, he was seen getting angry on the fielders when there was no chance that the ball could be stopped. While some slammed Krunal for his behavior, few have turned him into a meme material trolling him. Later in the tournament, Pandya grabbed the attention over his questionable behavior again after being caught throwing moisturizer bottle towards Anukul Roy during the match against Rajasthan Royals.

In the 2022 IPL Auction, Pandya's was bought by the Lucknow Super Giants for ₹8.25 crores.

International career
In October 2018, Pandya was named in India's Twenty20 International (T20I) squads for their tours against the West Indies and Australia. He made his T20I debut for India against the West Indies on 4 November 2018, taking one wicket and scoring an unbeaten 21 runs off 9 balls. He was selected for India Twenty20 International team against Australia and played all three matches. In the first match he conceded 55 runs in four overs, but took 1/26 in the second T20I and won the Player of the Match award in the third match for his bowling performance of 4/36 in 4 overs.

In March 2021, he was named in India's One Day International (ODI) squad for their series against England. He made his ODI debut for India on 23 March 2021, against England, scoring 58 not out. His fifty was the fastest on debut in an ODI match, coming from 26 balls.

Personal life
He is the elder brother of fellow Indian cricketer Hardik Pandya. On 27 December 2017, he married Pankhuri Sharma. The couple have a son, Kavir Krunal Pandya, born on 24 July 2022.

In January 2021, Indian cricketer Deepak Hooda wrote a scathing letter addressed to the Baroda Cricket Association accusing Krunal Pandya of using ‘abusive language’ and ‘threats to end his career’ and Hooda pulled himself out of the Syed Mushtaq Ali Trophy 2021. 
On 27 July 2021, he tested positive for COVID-19.

In January 2022, Pandya's Twitter account was hacked, and suspicious tweets were posted from an alleged bitcoin scammer. Later in the day, all of the hacker's tweets were deleted and Pandya posted a tweet apologizing.

References

External links
 
 

1991 births
Living people
Indian cricketers
India One Day International cricketers
India Twenty20 International cricketers
Baroda cricketers
Mumbai Indians cricketers
Cricketers from Surat
Indian A cricketers
Lucknow Super Giants cricketers